Center or Centre for Science Education may refer to

 Challenger Center for Space Science Education
 National Center for Science Education, Oakland, California
 Wright Center for Science Education, Tufts University
 British Centre for Science Education
 Homi Bhabha Centre for Science Education, Mumbai, India
 Centre for Science Education, a research and business development unit of Sheffield Hallam University
 Centre for Science Education and Communication, a unit of the University of Delhi